William Hennebery (1 May 1888 – 16 February 1965) was an Irish hurler. Usually lining out as a centre-back, he was a member of the Kilkenny team that won the 1909 All-Ireland Championship.

Hennebery played his club hurling with Mooncoin, however, he enjoyed little in terms of championship success during his brief career.

After first being selected for the Kilkenny senior team in 1909, Hennebery was a regular member of the team for that championship seasons. He won a Leinster medal that year before later winning his sole All-Ireland medal after Kilkenny's defeat of Tipperary in the final.

Hennebery died after a short illness on 16 February 1965.

Honours

Kilkenny
All-Ireland Senior Hurling Championship (1): 1909
Leinster Senior Hurling Championship (1): 1909

References

1888 births
1965 deaths
Mooncoin hurlers
Kilkenny inter-county hurlers
All-Ireland Senior Hurling Championship winners